is a town located in Shiribeshi, Hokkaido, Japan.

As of 24 May 2020 the town had an estimated population of 2,739, and a density of 7.2 persons per km2. The total area of the town is 345.65 km2.

Geography
Kuromatsunai is located in the southern part of Shiribeshi Subprefecture and while close to both the Sea of Japan and the Pacific Ocean, the town itself has no coastline. The Shubuto River and Kuromatsunai River flow through Kuromatsunai.

The town, being the northernmost area of Japan in which beech trees grow naturally, has had the beech tree designated a natural treasure.

Neighboring towns and village
 Shiribeshi Subprefecture
 Suttsu
 Rankoshi
 Shimamaki
 Iburi Subprefecture
 Toyoura
 Oshima Subprefecture
 Oshamambe

Climate

History
1902: Kuromatsunai Village becomes a Second Class Village.
1915: Neppu Village becomes a Second Class Village.
1923: Tarukishi Village becomes a Second Class Village.
1955: Kuromatsunai Village, Neppu Village, and a part of Tarukishi Village are merged to form the new village of Miwa.
1959: Miwa Village becomes Miwa Town.
1959: Miwa is renamed Kuromatsunai.

Transportation
 Hakodate Main Line: Kuromatsunai Station - Neppu Station
 : Kuromatsunai JCT
 : Kuromatsunai JCT - Kuromatsunai-minami IC - Kuromatsunai IC

Sister city
  Seiyo, Ehime (since 1993)

Education
 Junior high schools
 Kuromatsunai Junior High School
 Shiroikawa Junior High School
 Elementary schools
 Kuromatsunai Elementary School
 Shiroikawa Elementary School

References

External links

Official Website 

Towns in Hokkaido